The  were a class of thirty-two torpedo boat destroyers (TBDs) of the Imperial Japanese Navy. The Kamikaze class of destroyers were the first destroyers to be mass-produced in Japan. The class is also sometimes referred to as the Asakaze class. This class of destroyer should not be confused with the later Kamikaze-class destroyers built in 1922, which participated in the Pacific War.

Background
The Kamikaze-class destroyers were part of the 1904 Imperial Japanese Navy Emergency Expansion Program created by the outbreak of the Russo-Japanese War. Twenty-five vessels were ordered in 1904; an additional four vessels were ordered in 1905, and three more in 1906, bringing the total to thirty-two ships. The Japanese governmental shipyards were overwhelmed with the volume of construction, and for the first time civilian shipyards were also assigned to produce warships.

Design
However, with operational experience gained in the Russo-Japanese War, the Kamikaze class employed shorter smokestacks with spark and glow arrestors to give the ships a more stealthy capability for night combat operations.

Internally, design and production issues still existed with the Japanese copies of the Yarrow water-tube boilers in the coal-fired triple expansion steam engines, which could produce only ; however, with the final three vessels (Uranami, Isonami, Ayanami), many problems had been resolved, and the engines modified to be run on heavy fuel oil as well as coal.

Armament was the similar in layout to the previous , but with larger secondary guns; i.e. two QF 12 pounder 12 cwt naval guns (on a bandstand on the forecastle and on the quarterdeck), four additional short barrel 12 pounder guns (two sited abreast the conning tower, and two sited between the funnels), and two single tubes for  torpedoes.

Operational history
Only two Kamikaze-class vessels were completed in time to see combat service in the Russo-Japanese War.

Considered too small, unsuitable for heavy seas, and obsolete by the time of completion, the Kamikaze-class destroyers were quickly removed from front-line combat service after the end of the war, and were de-rated to third-class destroyers on 28 August 1912. Asatsuyu was wrecked off Nanao Bay on 9 November 1913.

However, despite the re-classification, all remaining vessels saw service in World War I. Shirotae was lost in combat on 3 September 1914 off Tsingtao, while in combat against the German gunboat SMS Jaguar. This was the first significant warship loss by Japan during World War I.

Eighteen of the remaining surviving vessels were converted into minesweepers on 1 December 1924, and the others struck. However, all of the converted vessels were retired and/or scrapped soon afterwards.

Ships

References

Notes

Books

External links

Destroyer classes
 
World War I destroyers of Japan
Ships built in Japan